Porea is one of 43 islands in the Manihiki atoll of the Cook Islands. It is a small islet which marks the southern edge of the atoll. It is separated from Tauhunu in the west and Motu Hakamaru by a large number of small islets.

References

Manihiki